Eagles Fly Early is a 1966 Yugoslav adventure film based on the eponymous novel by Branko Ćopić.

Cast 
 Čkalja - Poljar Lijan
 Pavle Jovanović - Jovanče
 Ljubče Popović - Lazar Mačak

References

External links 

1966 adventure films
1966 films
Yugoslav adventure films
War films set in Partisan Yugoslavia